The following is a list of releases by Teen-Beat. TeenBeat Records was established in 1984.

Each item in the list includes the catalogue number, artist, the release name, the release medium or media.

1984–present

TEENBEAT J. UNREST, "This Side, Numskull" cassette
TEENBEAT 1. Extremism in the Defense of Liberty is No Vice, various artists cassette
TEENBEAT 2. UNREST, cassette
TEENBEAT 3. WILLIAM & VIVIAN, "Fly to France" cassette
TEENBEAT 4. THIRSTY BOYS, cassette
TEENBEAT 5. CLARENCE, cassette
TEENBEAT 6. UNREST "Lisa Carol Freemont", cassette
TEENBEAT 7. UNREST, 7"
TEENBEAT 8. Kim Says, poster
TEENBEAT 9. FLOWERS OF DISCIPLINE, 7"
TEENBEAT 10. JUNGLE GEORGE & THE PLAGUE, "From Tree to Shining Tree", cassette
TEENBEAT 11. The Trouble with Harry, various artists cassette
TEENBEAT 12. Teenbeat logo, tee shirt
TEENBEAT 13. SCALEY ANDREW "Too Tight to Tango", cassette
TEENBEAT 14. UNREST, LP
TEENBEAT 15. SYNTHETIC SOCKS, cassette
TEENBEAT 16. SCALEY ANDREW, "Nervous Twitch" cassette
TEENBEAT 17. MARK ROBINSON "Black Christmas", cassette
TEENBEAT 18. CRISPY AMBULANCE, cassette
TEENBEAT 19. Paint My Dick, cassette of spoken audio
TEENBEAT 20. UNREST, station wagon
TEENBEAT 21. UNREST "Malcolm X Park", LP/cassette
TEENBEAT 22. The Tube Bar, spoken audio cassette
TEENBEAT 23. UNREST "Twister", cassette
TEENBEAT 24. The Straight Line, issue 3, magazine
TEENBEAT 25. CLARENCE "Hurry Up", cassette
TEENBEAT 26. UNREST, metal CD jewel case
TEENBEAT 27. MARK ROBINSON "KingXMas", cassette
TEENBEAT 28. UNREST "Catchpellet", 7"
TEENBEAT 29. VOMIT LAUNCH "Relapsation", 7"
TEENBEAT 30. SCALEY ANDREW "The Soul of Postmodernism", cassette
TEENBEAT 31. The Tube Bar, spoken audio LP
TEENBEAT 32. UNREST "Mark E", poster
TEENBEAT 33. SCALEY ANDREW "Raising the Goddess", 7"
TEENBEAT 34. UNREST "Invoking Osiris", tee shirt
TEENBEAT 35. UNREST "Kustom Karnal BlackXPloitation", LP/cassette
TEENBEAT 36. Teenbeat Fiesta Days, @King's Dominion
TEENBEAT 37. MARK E SUPERSTAR "Sammy Supreme My Man", 7"
TEENBEAT 38. DUSTdevils "Is Big Leggy", 7"
TEENBEAT 39. JONNY COHEN'S LOVE MACHINE, LP
TEENBEAT 40. SCALEY ANDREW "Meridian Hill Park", cassette
TEENBEAT 41. UNREST and DUSTdevils "Live at D.C. Space", cassette
TEENBEAT 42. UNREST "Yes She is My Skinhead Girl", 7"
TEENBEAT 43. UNREST "Live at the Tube Bar", tee shirt
TEENBEAT 44. BUTCH WILLIS "Shopping Bag", 7"
TEENBEAT 45. CLARENCE, three cassette box set
TEENBEAT 46. The Wedding of Terry Tolkin and Justine Chiara
TEENBEAT 47. THE KROKODILOES, cassette
TEENBEAT 48. DUSTdevils "Struggling Electric and Chemical, LP/cassette/CD
TEENBEAT 49. UNREST "Cherry Cherry", 7"
TEENBEAT 50. Teenbeat Fifty, various artists LP/cassette/CD
TEENBEAT 51. Teenbeat's Sixth Anniversary banquet
TEENBEAT 52. VOMIT LAUNCH "Of", 7"
TEENBEAT 53. BELLS OF, one-sided LP, not released
TEENBEAT 54. BUTCH WILLIS & THE ROCKS "Conquering the Ice", LP, not released
TEENBEAT 55. SEXUAL MILKSHAKE "Space Gnome and Other Hits", 7"
TEENBEAT 56. UNREST "Chocolate City Cherry", CD, not released
TEENBEAT 57. MARK E SUPERSTAR, cassette
TEENBEAT 58. Teenbeat 1991 calendar
TEENBEAT 59. Teenbeat Funbox, 16 cassette box
TEENBEAT 60. SCALEY ANDREW "You're Safer at Home", cassette
TEENBEAT 61. Teenbeat "Skater Girls" catalog
TEENBEAT 62. FLYING SAUCER "Real", 7"
TEENBEAT 63. UNREST "A Factory Record", 7"
TEENBEAT 64. Cityslicker, travel magazine, not published
TEENBEAT 65. SEXUAL MILKSHAKE "Hip Death Goddess", tee shirt
TEENBEAT 66. EGGS "Skyscraper", 7"
TEENBEAT 67. UNREST "Fuck Pussy Galore & all her Friends", LP/cassette/CD
TEENBEAT 68. Teenbeat ballpoint pen
TEENBEAT 69. JONNY COHEN "Space Butterfly", 7"
TEENBEAT 70. UNREST "Isabel Bishop", 7"/12"/CD
TEENBEAT 70. UNREST "Winona Ryder", version xx 7", xy 7", not released
TEENBEAT 71. KENNETH ANGER "Soundtracks", cassette
TEENBEAT 72. UNREST "Imperial f.f.r.r.", tee shirt and poster
TEENBEAT 73. ANDREW BEAUJON "Valenteen", cassette
TEENBEAT 74. UNREST "Cherry Cream On", video shoot
TEENBEAT 75. SEXUAL MILKSHAKE "Sing-a-Long in Hebrew", LP/CD
TEENBEAT 76. EGGS "Eggs Bruiser LP", LP/CD
TEENBEAT 77. UNREST "Imperial f.f.r.r.", LP/cassette/CD
TEENBEAT 78. UNREST "Imperial f.f.r.r.", ceramic coffee mug
TEENBEAT 79. JONNY COHEN "Space Butterfly", original cover art, not used
TEENBEAT 80. Teenbeat 1992 Annual Report
TEENBEAT 81. The Tube Bar, 'deluxe' CD
TEENBEAT 82. LOS MARAUDERS "You Make Me Cum in My Pants", 7"
TEENBEAT 83. SCALEY ANDREW "In a Deep Blue Funk", cassette
TEENBEAT 84. UNREST "Bavarian Mods and Other Hits", 7"
TEENBEAT 85. VOMIT LAUNCH "Dogeared", cassette/CD
TEENBEAT 86. EGGS, tee shirt
TEENBEAT 87. Teenbeat business cards
TEENBEAT 88. GRENADINE "Fillings", 7"
TEENBEAT 89. JONNY COHEN "Indian Giver, 7"
TEENBEAT 90. Zenith Solid State Stereo, a gift from Jenny Toomey
TEENBEAT 91. UNREST "West Coast Love Affair", 7"
TEENBEAT 92. Teenbeat's Seventh Anniversary banquet
TEENBEAT 93. BELLS OF "11:11", CD
TEENBEAT 94. BLAST OFF COUNTRY STYLE "I Love Entertainment", 7"
TEENBEAT 95. GASTR DEL SOL "The Serpentine Similar", LP/CD
TEENBEAT 96. EGGS "Teenbeat 96 Eggs Exploder", LP/cassette/CD
TEENBEAT 97. Teenbeat house, Arlington, VA
TEENBEAT 98. Teenbeat matchbooks
TEENBEAT 98. UNREST "So Sick", 7"
TEENBEAT 99. GRENADINE "Goya", LP/cassette/CD

TEENBEAT 100. Teenbeat 100, 10 1 minute songs by 10 bands, 7"
TEENBEAT 101. 1992 Teenbeat Christmas card
TEENBEAT 102. BARBARA MANNING "B4 We Go Under", 7"
TEENBEAT 103. Teenbeat's Eighth Anniversary celebrations and banquet
TEENBEAT 104. BLAST OFF COUNTRY STYLE "Pretty Sneaky Sis'", 7"
TEENBEAT 105. UNREST "Cath Carroll", 7" and "CCEP" 12"/CD
TEENBEAT 106. IN CAMERA "13 (Lucky for Some)", CD
TEENBEAT 107. UNREST & Teenbeat, agreement with 4AD
TEENBEAT 108. UNREST "Perfect Hairdo", comb
TEENBEAT 109. JONNY COHEN'S LOVE MACHINE "Getting Our Heads Together", CD
TEENBEAT 110. Teenbeat 1993 annual report
TEENBEAT 111. GRENADINE "Don't Forget the Halo"/"777", 7"
TEENBEAT 112. UNREST "Angel I'll Walk You Home", 7"
TEENBEAT 114. BLAST OFF COUNTRY STYLE "Giggles and Gloom", 7"
TEENBEAT 115. Teenage Gang Debs, fanzine sold in our catalog
TEENBEAT 116. EGGS "A Pit with Spikes", 7"
TEENBEAT 117. CATH CARROLL permission to use her image on 119
TEENBEAT 118. UNREST, sticker and coffee mug
TEENBEAT 119. UNREST "Perfect Teeth", 7"box/LP/cassette/CD
TEENBEAT 120. COBALT "Watercress Mill", LP/CD, not released
TEENBEAT 121. STEREOLAB / UNREST tour single, 7"
TEENBEAT 122. LOS MARAUDERS "Every Song We Fuckin' Know", LP
TEENBEAT 123. Teenbeat interns
TEENBEAT 124. BLAST OFF COUNTRY STYLE "What Gives?", 7"
TEENBEAT 125. GASTR DEL SOL "20 Songs Less", 7"
TEENBEAT 126. UNREST "Make Out Club", 7"/remix 7"
TEENBEAT 127. 1993 Teenbeat Christmas card
TEENBEAT 128. VOMIT LAUNCH "Not Even Pretty+", CD
TEENBEAT 129. Teenbeat business license with Arlington County
TEENBEAT 130. NO TREND "The Early Months", CD
TEENBEAT 131. BLAST OFF COUNTRY STYLE "C'mon and Blast Off Country Style", LP/CD
TEENBEAT 132. Teenbeat's Ninth Anniversary celebrations, banquet, and performance
TEENBEAT 133. UNREST "Light Command", 7" and "Afternoon Train", remix 7"
TEENBEAT 134. BUTCH WILLIS & THE ROCKS "Repeats", CD
TEENBEAT 135. SEXUAL MILKSHAKE 7" goes out of print
TEENBEAT 136. EGGS "Genetic Engineering", 7"
TEENBEAT 137. CATH CARROLL "My Cold Heart", 7"
TEENBEAT 138. EGGS "Morning Blend", coffee beans
TEENBEAT 139. TUSCADERO "Mount Pleasant", 7"
TEENBEAT 140. Teenbeat hires first paid employee
TEENBEAT 141. "Wakefield" volume one, "A Teenbeat Sampler", various artists CD
TEENBEAT 142. VERSUS "The Stars are Insane", LP/cassette/CD
TEENBEAT 143. BELLS OF "Two Dos or not 2?", CD
TEENBEAT 144. BLAST OFF COUNTRY STYLE "Rainbow Mayonnaise Deluxe", LP/CD
TEENBEAT 145. UNCLE WIGGLY LP/CD, original catalog number
TEENBEAT 146. VIVA SATELLITE! "Leonardo", 7"
TEENBEAT 147. AIR MIAMI "Airplane Rider"/"Stop Sign", 7"
TEENBEAT 148. BLAST OFF COUNTRY STYLE, tee shirt
TEENBEAT 149. TUSCADERO "Angel in a Half Shirt", 7"
TEENBEAT 150. ROMANIA "Planes", 7"
TEENBEAT 151. "Wakefield" volume two, "Hai Communist Tart", various artists CD
TEENBEAT 152. VERSUS "Big Head On", 7"
TEENBEAT 153. Teenbeat Circus Tour
TEENBEAT 154. BUTCH WILLIS & THE ROCKS "Conquering the Ice", CD
TEENBEAT 155. GRENADINE "Nopolitos", LP/CD
TEENBEAT 156. EGGS "How Do You Like Your Lobster?", CD
TEENBEAT 157. CATH CARROLL "Bad Star", 7"
TEENBEAT 158. TUSCADERO, tee shirt
TEENBEAT 159. TUSCADERO "The Pink Album", LP/CD
TEENBEAT 160. 1994 Teenbeat Christmas card
TEENBEAT 161. "Wakefield" volume three, "Superstars on 45", various artists CD
TEENBEAT 162. VERSUS "Dead Leaves", LP/cassette/CD
TEENBEAT 163. Teenbeat agreement with Matador
TEENBEAT 164. GAMMA RAYS "Lovely", 7"
TEENBEAT 165. PHIL KRAUTH "Cold Morning", LP/CD
TEENBEAT 166. GRENADINE "Christiansen", 7"
TEENBEAT 167. CATH CARROLL "True Crime Motel", LP/CD
TEENBEAT 168. AIR MIAMI, tee shirt
TEENBEAT 169. TUSCADERO "The Mark Robinson Re-mixes", 7"
TEENBEAT 170. ROMANIA "Remodel", CD
TEENBEAT 171. "Wakefield" volume four, "February 23, 1985", various artists CD
TEENBEAT 172. VERSUS, tee shirt
TEENBEAT 173. Teenbeat Tenth Anniversary celebrations
TEENBEAT 174. Different version of Tube Bar CD released by Detonator
TEENBEAT 175. UNREST "B.P.M.", LP/cassette/CD
TEENBEAT 176. Teenbeat Nights at O'Carroll's
TEENBEAT 177. AIR MIAMI "Me Me Me", LP/cassette/CD
TEENBEAT 178. Teenbeat rocks glass
TEENBEAT 179. TUSCADERO "Step into My Wiggle Room", LP/CD
TEENBEAT 180. Evelyn Hurley's hospital bill from injury occurring at Teenbeat 97
TEENBEAT 181. "Wakefield" four CD box set, incl. nos. 141/151/161/171/188
TEENBEAT 182. VERSUS "Dead Leaves", coffee mug
TEENBEAT 183. TEL AVIV "Cigarette 45", 7"
TEENBEAT 184. BLAST OFF COUNTRY STYLE "In My Arms", 10"/CD
TEENBEAT 185. UNCLE WIGGLY "Jump Back, Baby", LP/CD
TEENBEAT 186. VIVA SATELLITE! "Nishma", CD
TEENBEAT 187. MARK E SUPERSTAR "Sammy Supreme My Man", 7"
TEENBEAT 188. Teenbeat Book of Numbers (part of 171)
TEENBEAT 189. Teenbeat logo sticker
TEENBEAT 190. ROMANIA, tee shirt
TEENBEAT 191. 1996 Teenbeat Sampler, CD
TEENBEAT 192. VERSUS "Deep Red", 12"/CD
TEENBEAT 193. TEL AVIV, LP/CD
TEENBEAT 194. O'Carroll's restaurant/bar closes
TEENBEAT 195. PHIL KRAUTH "True Believer", 7", not released
TEENBEAT 196. THE FEMININE COMPLEX "Livin' Love", CD
TEENBEAT 197. AIR MIAMI "Pucker", 12", not released
TEENBEAT 198. Teenbeat Eleventh Anniversary coffee mug
TEENBEAT 199. CONTAINE "Only Cowards Walk Like Cowards", LP/CD, not released

TEENBEAT 200. OLYMPIC DEATH SQUAD "Blue", LP/CD
TEENBEAT 201. 1995 Teenbeat Christmas card
TEENBEAT 202. Teenbeat eleventh anniversary celebrations
TEENBEAT 203. Teenbeat agreement with Elektra
TEENBEAT 204. BUTCH WILLIS & THE ROCKS "Speedballs", 7"
TEENBEAT 205. PHIL KRAUTH "Silver Eyes", LP/CD
TEENBEAT 206. Teenbeat Graphica, inhouse design moniker of Mark Robinson
TEENBEAT 207. Teenbeat Circus Tour, part deux
TEENBEAT 208. Teenbeat computer mouse pad
TEENBEAT 209. RIVE GAUCHE "Egg Cream", 7", not released
TEENBEAT 210. Teenbeat internet website
TEENBEAT 211. ASCENSION "Incarnate", 7"
TEENBEAT 212. LOS MARAUDERS "Every Song We Fuckin' Know, CD
TEENBEAT 213. BELLS OF, tee shirt
TEENBEAT 214. "Teen Confessions" fanzine
TEENBEAT 215. THE GOLLIPOPPS "Moana", 7"
TEENBEAT 216. THE FEMININE COMPLEX "Hide and Seek", 7"
TEENBEAT 217. K-STARS "Testing", 7", not released
TEENBEAT 218. Teenbeat agreement with Matador concludes
TEENBEAT 219. TRUE LOVE ALWAYS "Mediterranean", 7"
TEENBEAT 220. 1996–1997 Teenbeat catalog
TEENBEAT 221. 1997 Teenbeat Sampler, CD
TEENBEAT 222. VERSUS "Secret Swingers", LP/CD
TEENBEAT 223. TEL AVIV "The Shape of Fiction", CD
TEENBEAT 224. GAMMA RAYS "Dynamite", 7"
TEENBEAT 225. THE ROPERS "The World is Fire", LP/CD
TEENBEAT 226. THE PROJECT "Celluloid Dreams of Superman", 7"
TEENBEAT 227. 1996 Teenbeat Christmas card
TEENBEAT 229. JONNY COHEN'S LOVE MACHINE "If 6 Were 8", CD
TEENBEAT 230. 1997 Teenbeat wholesale catalog
TEENBEAT 231. UNREST "Malcolm X Park", CD
TEENBEAT 232. LUNA "Pup Tent", LP
TEENBEAT 233. Teenbeat twelfth anniversary celebrations
TEENBEAT 234. BUTCH WILLIS "The Garden's Outside", 7"
TEENBEAT 235. 1997 Teenbeat catalog
TEENBEAT 236. THE FEMININE COMPLEX "To Be in Love", CD
TEENBEAT 237. Teenbeat drink coasters/beer mats
TEENBEAT 238. UNREST "Kustom Karnal BlackXPloitation", CD
TEENBEAT 239. TRUE LOVE ALWAYS "When Will You Be Mine?", CD
TEENBEAT 240. Brick at the entrance of the MCI Center (now Verizon Center), Washington, DC
TEENBEAT 241. FLIN FLON "Swift Current", 7"
TEENBEAT 242. VERSUS "Two Cents Plus Tax", LP
TEENBEAT 243. United Parcel Service strike
TEENBEAT 244. VIVA SATELLITE! "Extra Eye", tee shirt
TEENBEAT 245. PHIL KRAUTH "One Two Three", CD
TEENBEAT 246. VIVA SATELLITE! "Extra Eye", CD
TEENBEAT 247. Teenbeat Banquet, video, not released
TEENBEAT 248. THE RONDELLES, 7"
TEENBEAT 249. TRUE LOVE ALWAYS "Take Me Over", 7"
TEENBEAT 250. 1997 Teenbeat Christmas card
TEENBEAT 251. 1998 Teenbeat Sampler, CD
TEENBEAT 252. FLIN FLON "A-OK", LP/CD
TEENBEAT 253. TEL AVIV "The Century Expanded", CD, not released
TEENBEAT 254. TRUE LOVE ALWAYS, tee shirt
TEENBEAT 255. 1998 Teenbeat catalog
TEENBEAT 256. ANDREW BEAUJON "A Raw-Boned June", CD
TEENBEAT 257. AIR MIAMI "World Cup Fever", CD
TEENBEAT 258. Teenbeat 13th Anniversary coffee mug
TEENBEAT 259. TUSCADERO "My Way or the Highway", LP
TEENBEAT 260. Teenbeat 97 gutted and rebuilt
TEENBEAT 261. ROBERT SCHIPUL "The American Scene", CD
TEENBEAT 262. Teenbeat 13th anniversary celebrations
TEENBEAT 263. FLIN FLON "Black Bear", CD
TEENBEAT 264. HOT PURSUIT "Basketball"/"Hawaii", 7"
TEENBEAT 265. Teenbeat ad in Puncture
TEENBEAT 266. ADEN "Black Cow", CD
TEENBEAT 267. Teenbeat temporary offices, Wilson Blvd.
TEENBEAT 268. "Full Teenbeat Moon" booklet for CMJ
TEENBEAT 269. TRUE LOVE ALWAYS "Hopefully", CD
TEENBEAT 270. Connecticut warehouse
TEENBEAT 271. 1999 Teenbeat Sampler, CD
TEENBEAT 272. VERSUS "Wallflower", 7", included in 242
TEENBEAT 273. Teenbeat 14th anniversary celebrations
TEENBEAT 274. FLIN FLON "Boo-Boo", CD, "/version", LP
TEENBEAT 275. Teenbeat Chicago, warehouse at CTD
TEENBEAT 276. Teenbeat Boston, 922 Mass Ave, Cambridge MA
TEENBEAT 276. Teenbeat Boston tee shirts
TEENBEAT 277. www.teenbeatrecords.com, website redesign/domain name
TEENBEAT 278. THE RONDELLES "The Fox", LP/CD
TEENBEAT 279. TRUE LOVE ALWAYS "Buried Treasure", 7"
TEENBEAT 280. BRIDGET CROSS, KATHI WILCOX, DOUG BAILEY "Love Will Rule our Party, 7"
TEENBEAT 281. 1998 Teenbeat Christmas card
TEENBEAT 282. Teenbeat soccer jerseys
TEENBEAT 283. BELLS OF "3's Company", CD
TEENBEAT 284. BUTCH WILLIS & D FLAT "Superstitious Mummies", CD
TEENBEAT 285. FLIN FLON "Chicoutimi", CD
TEENBEAT 286. ADEN "Hey 19", CD
TEENBEAT 287. 1999 Teenbeat Christmas card, not issued
TEENBEAT 287. 2000 Teenbeat Christmas card, not issued
TEENBEAT 288. Teenbeat shipping labels
TEENBEAT 289. HOT PURSUIT "The Thrill Department", CD
TEENBEAT 290. THE RONDELLES, poster
TEENBEAT 291. 2000 Teenbeat Sampler, CD
TEENBEAT 292. Teenbeat 15th anniversary celebrations
TEENBEAT 293. "Shindig", Evelyn Hurley & Mark Robinson, wedding party
TEENBEAT 294. THE MARK ROBINSON, tee shirt
TEENBEAT 295. U.S. Olympic Committee demands band Olympic Death Squad stop using "olympic" in their name
TEENBEAT 296. FLIN FLON "Current, Swift", CD, not released
TEENBEAT 297. MARK ROBINSON "Canada's Green Highways", LP/CD
TEENBEAT 298. TRUE LOVE ALWAYS "Windows Fade", 7"
TEENBEAT 299. TRUE LOVE ALWAYS "Torch", CD

TEENBEAT 300. The Warm Series, a series of CDs sharing the same stock "The Warm Series" digipak
TEENBEAT 301. MARK ROBINSON, the "Em" series
TEENBEAT 302. MARK ROBINSON "Taste", CD
TEENBEAT 303. Teenbeat Sweet 16th Anniversary celebrations
TEENBEAT 304. MARK ROBINSON "Proposal", CD, not released
TEENBEAT 305. MARK ROBINSON "Tiger Banana"/"Em", poster
TEENBEAT 306. MARK ROBINSON "Presentation", CD, not released
TEENBEAT 307. MARK ROBINSON "Tiger Banana", CD
TEENBEAT 308. MARK ROBINSON "Performance", CD, not released
TEENBEAT 309. TRUE LOVE ALWAYS "Spring Collection", LP/CD
TEENBEAT 310. John Lindaman (True Love Always)  tattoo
TEENBEAT 311. 2001 Teenbeat sampler, CD
TEENBEAT 312. TRACY SHEDD "Blue", CD
TEENBEAT 313. TRUE LOVE ALWAYS, postcard
TEENBEAT 314. HOT PURSUIT "Culottes", CD, not released
TEENBEAT 315. THE SCREAMER "Greatest Hits", CD
TEENBEAT 316. ADEN "Aden", DOWNLOAD, re-issue
TEENBEAT 317. MARK ROBINSON "Origami and Urbanism", LP/CD
TEENBEAT 318. Teenbeat electronic newsletter
TEENBEAT 319. Teenbeat archival stock inlay cards
TEENBEAT 320. 2001 Teenbeat holiday card
TEENBEAT 321. McCann Corner, Teenbeat office and warehouse
TEENBEAT 322. Teenbeat 17th anniversary celebrations
TEENBEAT 323. +/- (Plus/Minus) "Self Titled Long Playing Debut Album", CD
TEENBEAT 324. THE PACIFIC OCEAN "So Beautiful and Cheap and Warm", CD
TEENBEAT 325. PHIL KRAUTH "Tight Fit", CD, original catalog number
TEENBEAT 325. THE FONTAINE TOUPS "TFT", CD, original catalog number
TEENBEAT 326. ADEN "Topsiders", CD
TEENBEAT 327. Teenbeat archival CD-R
TEENBEAT 328. POCKET ROCKETS "Love or Perish", CD
TEENBEAT 329. TRUE LOVE ALWAYS "Clouds", LP/CD
TEENBEAT 330. TIMONIUM, design studio
TEENBEAT 331. 2002 Teenbeat sampler, CD
TEENBEAT 332. Teenbeat 2002 postcard catalog
TEENBEAT 333. Teenbeat 18th anniversary celebrations
TEENBEAT 334. Teenbeat advertisement in Snap Pop
TEENBEAT 335. Teenbeat website redesign
TEENBEAT 336. CURRITUCK CO. "Unpacking my Library", CD
TEENBEAT 337. MARK ROBINSON "Stuttgart Please Please", 7"
TEENBEAT 338. RONDELLES, tee shirt
TEENBEAT 339. A Teenbeat subscription
TEENBEAT 340. HORSE ING TWO=HIT "Tilt", CD
TEENBEAT 341. 2003 Teenbeat sampler, CD
TEENBEAT 342. Teenbeat 'A New International', tee shirt
TEENBEAT 343. +/- (Plus/Minus) "Holding Patterns", CD
TEENBEAT 344. Teenbeat tribute CD is released
TEENBEAT 345. Teenbeat print advertisements
TEENBEAT 346. CNN/Anderson Cooper 360 uses FLIN FLON "Floods" as their theme song
TEENBEAT 347. Joseph 'Bunny' Smith Square studio, changed to McCann Corner studio
TEENBEAT 348. Teenbeat 'Double X' shipping labels
TEENBEAT 349. Teenbeat Subscribers' CD 2003
TEENBEAT 350. hollAnd "I Steal and Do Drugs", DVD
TEENBEAT 351. 2002 Teenbeat holiday/new year card
TEENBEAT 352. TRACY SHEDD "Red", CD
TEENBEAT 353. Teenbeat distribution agreement with IODAlliance
TEENBEAT 354. +/- (Plus/Minus), tee shirt
TEENBEAT 355. Teenbeat 2003–2004 "Greeting Card" catalog
TEENBEAT 356. THE SISTERHOOD OF CONVOLUTED THINKERS "Better Days, Coming Now!", CD
TEENBEAT 357. 2003 Teenbeat holiday/new year card
TEENBEAT 358. +/- (Plus/Minus) song "All I Do" appears in film and soundtrack for "Wicker Park"
TEENBEAT 359. Teenbeat Subscribers' CD 2004
TEENBEAT 360. hollAnd "I Steal and Do Drugs", CD
TEENBEAT 361. 2004 Teenbeat sampler, CD
TEENBEAT 362. Teenbeat 19th anniversary celebrations
TEENBEAT 363. +/- (Plus/Minus) "You Are Here", CD
TEENBEAT 364. BUTCH WILLIS "Rawed Out of the Bottom Basement", CD, long and short versions
TEENBEAT 365. +/- (Plus/Minus) "You Are Here", postcard
TEENBEAT 366. Teenbeat, new email account
TEENBEAT 367. MARK ROBINSON "An Architectural Classic", LP/CD, not released
TEENBEAT 368. +/- (Plus/Minus) "You Are Here", promotional CD
TEENBEAT 369. Teenbeat Mail Order, receipt forms
TEENBEAT 370. Teenbeat 370 music publishing company, affiliated with BMI
TEENBEAT 371. Teenbeat 'Future Fever' series, internet only releases
TEENBEAT 372. THE FONTAINE TOUPS "TFT", CD
TEENBEAT 373. Teenbeat 20th anniversary commemorative celebrations
TEENBEAT 374. Teenbeat 20th anniversary commemorative pin no.1
TEENBEAT 375. Teenbeat 2005–2004 postcard catalog
TEENBEAT 376. Teenbeat 20th anniversary commemorative, flyer and poster
TEENBEAT 377. FLIN FLON "Dixie", CD
TEENBEAT 378. Teenbeat address rubber stamp
TEENBEAT 379. Teenbeat 20th anniversary commemorative pin no.2
TEENBEAT 380. 2004 Teenbeat holiday paper airplane
TEENBEAT 381. Teenbeat 20th anniversary commemorative CD
TEENBEAT 382. Teenbeat 20th anniversary commemorative, tee shirt
TEENBEAT 383. +/- (Plus/Minus) and BLOODTHIRSTY BUTCHERS "Banging the Drum", CD
TEENBEAT 384. BUTCH WILLIS "Locked in this Room (Live at the Black Cat)", Future Fever album
TEENBEAT 385. PHIL KRAUTH "Tight Fit", CD
TEENBEAT 386. FLIN FLON "Dixie", postcard
TEENBEAT 387. Teenbeat notecards ('letterhead') and business card
TEENBEAT 388. FLIN FLON "Dixie (Version)", Re-Mixes LP
TEENBEAT 389. Teenbeat Subscribers' CD 2005
TEENBEAT 390. Apple iPod to compile "Teenbeat Library" and file transfer
TEENBEAT 391. 'Teenbeat Deluxe Edition' series
TEENBEAT 392. The production of UNREST "Imperial f.f.r.r." Deluxe Edition
TEENBEAT 395. Teenbeat catalog poster, not printed
TEENBEAT 398. Teenbeat Book of Numbers, volume two, for html and iPod

TEENBEAT 400. hollAnd, "The Paris Hilton Mujahideen", CD
TEENBEAT 403. COTTON CANDY, "A Souvenir Album", CD
TEENBEAT 407. BOSSANOVA, "Hey, Sugar", CD
TEENBEAT 409. TRUE LOVE ALWAYS, "Very Important Love Songs", CD
TEENBEAT 410. The Teenbeat Originals series of re-issues and new releases. All come in a stock TBOriginals digipak
TEENBEAT 411. "Teenbeat No.1 Record Label" various artists CD
TEENBEAT 419. FLIN FLON, "Et Cetera", album DOWNLOAD
TEENBEAT 425. SUBJECT TO CHANGE, "Somerville Speakout", CD 
TEENBEAT 427. BOSSANOVA, "Bossanova", EP DOWNLOAD 
TEENBEAT 430. hollAnd, "Love Fluxus", CD
TEENBEAT 433. LOUDEST BOOM BAH YEA, "Booty Beats Fully Realized", LP, 2009
TEENBEAT 434. MAYBE IT'S RENO, "Maybe It's Reno", CD, 2008
TEENBEAT 442. TRACY SHEDD, "Cigarettes & Smoke Machines", LP/CD, 2008
TEENBEAT 450. Teen-Beat World Wide Web Site, 2010
TEENBEAT 451. Teenbeat.net email addresses, 2008
TEENBEAT 452. VERSUS, "Let's Electrify", re-issue
TEENBEAT 454. COTTON CANDY, "Fantastic & Spectacular", 7", 2009
TEENBEAT 457. COTTON CANDY, "Top-Notch & First-Rate", LP, 2010
TEENBEAT 460. hollAnd, "I Blow Up", CD, 2010
TEENBEAT 462. UNREST, "Newcastle, August 2, 1993", CD, 2009
TEENBEAT 463. @Teenbeat463, Mark Robinson's Twitter account
TEENBEAT 469. UNREST, "Washington, DC, February 25, 2005", CD, 2009
TEENBEAT 493. BELLS OF, "Young McDonald and the 5 Season Farmers", CD, 2010

References

Discographies of American record labels